The Uniform Electronic Legal Material Act is a model act drafted and approved by the Uniform Law Commission (ULC) to create standards for authenticating and preserving digital legal documents, such as official statutes, codes, regulations and decisions. The model act was approved by the ULC in July 2011. Twelve states have since passed legislation based on the model act:

 California
 Colorado
 Connecticut
 Delaware
 Hawaii
 Idaho
 Illinois
 Minnesota
 Nevada
 North Dakota
 Oregon
 Pennsylvania

References

Uniform Acts